WOSM may refer to:

 World Organization of the Scout Movement, a non-governmental international organization
 WOSM (FM), a radio station (103.1 FM) in Ocean Springs, Mississippi, United States
 Worldwide Oil Spill Model, a simulation program for oil spills; see Oil spill#Estimating the volume of a spill